Xiangshan station can refer to the following stations:

Stations in Taiwan
Xiangshan metro station (象山站), a MRT station in Taipei
Xiangshan railway station (香山站), a TRA station in Hsinchu

Stations in China
Fragrant Hills station (Beijing Subway) (香山站), a light rail station in the Beijing Subway, also known as Xiangshan station in Chinese
Taihu Xiangshan station (太湖香山站), a station on Line 5 of the Suzhou Metro
Xiangshan Campus, China Academy of Art station (美院象山站), a station on Line 6 of the Hangzhou Metro
Xiangshan station (Guangzhou Metro), a station under construction on the Southern extension of Line 18 of Guangzhou Metro, located in Zhongshan City, Guangdong Province, China

See also
Xiangshan (disambiguation)